Sir George William Agnew, 2nd Baronet, JP (19 January 1852 – 19 December 1941), was a British art dealer, publisher and Liberal politician.

Early life
He was the eldest son of William Agnew and his wife Mary née Kenworthy. The Agnew family had been prominent in the municipal life of Salford for generations. He was educated at Rugby School from 1865 to 1870 and St John's College, Cambridge, receiving Bachelor of Arts degree in 1874 and Master of Arts in 1877. While at St John's, Agnew played rugby for Cambridge University and played in the very first Varsity Match. Although Oxford won the first encounter, Agnew was part of the Cambridge team that won the second and drew the third match, making him a three time sporting 'Blue'. His brothers, Charles and William, also played for Cambridge University; Charles winning two sporting caps and William three.

He was a partner in the firm of Thomas Agnew & Sons, art publishers and a member of the firm of Bradbury, Agnew & Sons, proprietors of the satirical magazine Punch. He was well known as an expert in art sales and appreciation and in 1877 he was Honorary Secretary to the Manchester Jubilee Fine Arts Committee. He was also a governor of Manchester Victoria University and of the Royal Manchester Children's Hospital in Pendlebury. He married Fanny Bolton, daughter of John Stuart Bolton, on 2 October 1878, and they had two sons and five daughters.

Politics
At the 1906 general election Agnew was elected as Liberal Member of Parliament for Salford West, unseating the incumbent Conservative Lees Knowles. He held the seat at the next two elections, before retiring from parliament in 1918.

Baronetcy
His father had been created Baronet Agnew, of Great Stanhope Street, in 1895. On his death on 31 October 1910 George succeeded as 2nd Baronet. He retired from the family firm at the same time.

Later life
The family moved to Rougham Hall, near Bury St Edmunds, Suffolk. Sir George was High Sheriff of Suffolk in 1922. He was commissioned Major in the 2nd Battalion, Suffolk Volunteer Regiment in September 1916 and was promoted Honorary Lieutenant-Colonel in 1918.

He died at Thurston Grange, Suffolk, in December 1941 aged 89.

Notes

References

'AGNEW, Sir George (William)’, Who Was Who, A & C Black, 1920–2007; online edn, Oxford University Press, Dec 2007

External links 
 

1852 births
1941 deaths
George
Baronets in the Baronetage of the United Kingdom
Liberal Party (UK) MPs for English constituencies
UK MPs 1906–1910
UK MPs 1910
UK MPs 1910–1918
People educated at Rugby School
Suffolk Regiment officers
Alumni of St John's College, Cambridge
High Sheriffs of Suffolk
Cambridge University R.U.F.C. players
Members of the Parliament of the United Kingdom for Salford West